Stanisław Grodzicki (1912 in Ostrołęka – 1946 near Orpington) was a Polish fighter pilot and a lieutenant colonel (Podpułkownik) of the Polish Air Force during World War II. He fought during The Blitz in 1941 as a night fighter pilot with No. 307 Polish Fighter Squadron, flying the Boulton Paul Defiant. From November 1940 to June 1941 he was also the commanding officer of the unit. He was awarded the Distinguished Flying Cross.

In 1946, he was killed in an air crash when the Dakota of 435 Squadron RCAF, in which he was a passenger crashed during a bad weather landing approach to Croydon Airport.

He is buried in Star Lane Cemetery, in St Mary Cray, Kent.

References 

1912 births
1947 deaths
Polish aviators
Polish World War II pilots
Polish military personnel killed in World War II
Aviators killed in aviation accidents or incidents in England
People from Ostrołęka
People from Łomża Governorate